Eileen is a 2023 American period psychological thriller film directed by William Oldroyd and starring Thomasin McKenzie and Anne Hathaway. It is based on the 2015 novel of the same name by Ottessa Moshfegh and adapted into a screenplay by Moshfegh with her husband Luke Goebel. Set in 1960s Boston, the film trails a parasitic relationship between two women working at a juvenile detention facility.

Eileen premiered at the 2023 Sundance Film Festival on January 21, 2023.

Premise
In 1960s New England, Eileen is working at a prison when a captivating, glamorous counselor arrives and helps her access new facets of her personality but may be drawing her into something more dangerous.

Cast 
 Thomasin McKenzie as Eileen
 Anne Hathaway as Dr. Rebecca St. John
 Shea Whigham 
 Owen Teague as Randy
 Marin Ireland
 Jefferson White

Production
In August 2016, it was revealed that Erin Cressida Wilson was adapting the novel Eileen by Ottessa Moshfegh for Fox Searchlight and producer Scott Rudin. The novel was ultimately adapted by Moshfegh and her husband Luke Goebel. The mayor of Metuchen, New Jersey, Jonathan Busch, first confirmed that Anne Hathaway, Thomasin McKenzie, and Shea Whigham would have roles in the film. Filming commenced in late 2021 in Metuchen with filming locations also including South Amboy, New Jersey. It was one of a succession of productions that Hathaway was filming in New Jersey in 2021 and 2022.

Principal photography on the production was completed in February 2022. It was confirmed that Owen Teague and Marin Ireland had been added to the cast and that Endeavor Content and WME Independent were selling distribution rights. Author of the novel and the screenplay Moshfegh was quoted as saying it was "a very faithful adaptation of the tone" of her original work. In June 2022, she confirmed the edit was locked-in and said that McKenzie as Eileen was "amazing. It's like she was born to play that role, she's just so exciting to watch. And Anne Hathaway plays Rebecca, the sort of femme fatale character. I mean, we're watching it again today and the first cut of it, I was like, 'This is so much better than my book.' So the movie is really satisfying, I'm excited about that." Moshfegh said bringing her writer husband Luke Goebel into the script writing process made the script better because he was able to add another perspective to the story. They began writing drafts during the height of the COVID-19 lockdown in 2020 and avoiding seasonal wildfires from Oregon to Pasadena to Palm Springs with Moshfegh saying to Vanity Fair, "There was a sense of looming danger haunting us, which actually really helped the writing process." The score for the film was written by Richard Reed Parry, from the band Arcade Fire. Hathaway described the project as "Carol meets Reservoir Dogs".

Release
Eileen premiered at the 2023 Sundance Film Festival on January 21, 2023. It was previously reported that the film could be released in late 2022.

Reception

Critical reception
On the review aggregator website Rotten Tomatoes, Eileen holds an approval rating of 86% based on 59 reviews with an average rating of 7.5/10. The site's consensus reads: "Subverting expectations with nearly every well-heeled step, Eileen uses one toxic relationship to explore the unpredictable effect of perceived personal power." On Metacritic, which uses a weighted average, the film holds a score of 75 out 100, based on 18 reviews indicating "generally positive reviews". 

Reviewing the film following its premiere at Sundance, David Rooney of The Hollywood Reporter described Eileen as "a film both malevolent and playful, morbidly funny and disturbing", and commended the screenplay, direction, cinematography and cast performances. In his review for IndieWire, Ryan Lattanzio called the film a "perverse folie à deux", lauding the characters and cast performances (particularly Hathaway's and McKenzie's). Praising the screenplay, direction, cinematography, score and the cast performances in his review for Variety, Jessica Klang wrote: "The moviemaking terminology is apt, because this is a film that is practically drunk on the possibilities of cinema, pumping a recklessly modern energy through a plethora of classical Hollywood genres […] It moves, sometimes sinuously, sometimes with lurching abruptness, from Sirkian romantic melodrama to film noir into black-comedy horror, coming to rest somewhere in the realms of one of the more effed-up Hitchcock thrillers."

References

External links

2023 films
2023 independent films
Films set in New England
Films set in the 1960s
Films about alcoholism
Fictional prison officers and governors
Films shot in New Jersey
American psychological thriller films
2020s psychological thriller films
2020s American films
2023 LGBT-related films
LGBT-related thriller films